Elections to Waveney District Council took place on Thursday 5 May 2011. This was the first election held as a Whole Council election following a change made to the electoral system in 2010. As a result, all 48 council seats were contested.

Before the election the Conservative Party had an overall majority on the council with 25 councillors. The Labour Party had 15 councillors, Liberal Democrats two, the Green Party one and there were three Independent councillors and two vacant seats. As a result of the election the Conservative Party lost overall control, with both it and the Labour Party represented by 23 councillors, the balance of the council being made up of one Green Party and one Independent councillor. A series of procedural moves led to the formation of a Conservative-led administration.

Election result

[1] The two Conservative gains were the vacant seats in Oulton Broad and Southwold and Reydon. Both had been won by the party in 2008.

References

2011 English local elections
2011
2010s in Suffolk